A dish in gastronomy is a specific food preparation, a "distinct article or variety of food", ready to eat or to be served.

A dish may be served on tableware, or may be eaten in one's hands.

Instructions for preparing a dish are called recipes.

Some dishes, for example a hot dog with ketchup, rarely have their own recipes printed in cookbooks as they are made by simply combining two ready-to-eat foods.

Naming
Many dishes have specific names, such as sauerbraten, while others have descriptive names, such as "broiled ribsteak". Many are named for particular places, sometimes because of a specific association with that place, such as Boston baked beans or bistecca alla fiorentina, and sometimes not: poached eggs Florentine essentially means "poached eggs with spinach". Some are named for particular individuals:
 To honor them: for example, Brillat-Savarin cheese, named for the 18th-century French gourmet and famed political figure Jean Anthelme Brillat-Savarin;
 After the first person for whom the dish was prepared: for example, Chaliapin steak, made by the order of the Russian opera singer Feodor Chaliapin in 1934 in Japan;
 After the inventor, either being given the name by that person or because the dish was created in the inventor's kitchen.

Some dishes have many stories about their creation, which can sometimes make it difficult to know the true origin of the name of a dish.

See also

References

External links

 Famous Food Dishes and How they Got Their Names
 Chicken salad chick cookie recipe

Food preparation